Sea Trek may refer to:
 Sea Trek (diving system), an underwater helmet diving system
 Sea Trek (documentary), a TV documentary presented by Martha Holmes
 Sea Trek, a horse which won the Rebel Stakes in 1988
 Sea Trek 2001, a 2001 project to commemorate the exodus of Mormon pioneers from Europe during the 19th century